Ruth Paley is an English historian and author.

She has worked at The National Archives in Kew, London, where she has written several books.  She is currently working for the History of Parliament Trust on the House of Lords from 1660 to 1832. Since 2006, she has been editor of Archives, the journal of the British Records Association.

Works
 Using Criminal Records, Public Record Office, 2001 
 My Ancestor was a Bastard: a family historian's guide to sources for illegitimacy in England and Wales, Society of Genealogists, 2004 
 Family Skeletons: exploring the lives of our disreputable ancestors, with Simon Fowler, The National Archives, 2005

References

External links
 

English historians
British writers
Living people
British women historians
Year of birth missing (living people)